Flight of Fury is a 2007 American action thriller film directed by Michael Keusch, and starring Steven Seagal, who also co-wrote the screenplay with Joe Halpin. The film co-stars Steve Toussaint, Angus MacInnes and Mark Bazeley. The film was released direct-to-DVD in the United States on February 20, 2007.

Plot
Air Force pilot John Sands (Steven Seagal) has been wrongfully imprisoned in a military detention center where his memory is to be chemically wiped out. His superiors feel threatened by the knowledge he gained from his assignments to operations that were deemed too sensitive for regular intelligence services.

A top secret Air Force Stealth Bomber known as the X-77, capable of going anywhere undetected, is stolen by corrupt Air Force pilot Ratcher (Steve Toussaint). General Tom Barnes (Angus MacInnes), Sands' former commander, hears that Sands was arrested after taking down a group of men who were robbing a rest stop. It is revealed that Sands is Ratcher's trainer, Barnes sends Sands to northern Afghanistan with fellow pilot Rick Jannick (Mark Bazeley) to recover the X-77, by promising Sands that he will be a free man if he succeeds. Barnes has Admiral Frank Pendleton (Tim Woodward), who is on an aircraft carrier in the Gulf of Arabia, keep a team of pilots on standby just in case an air attack needs to be launched on the compound where the X-77 has been hidden.

Before Sands and Jannick arrive in Afghanistan, a Navy SEAL team that was planted there to meet them is killed by a group of men led by Eliana Reed (Katie Jones). Eliana kidnaps Jannick, and she takes him to her boss, Peter Stone (Vincenzo Nicoli), the man who paid Ratcher $100 million to steal the X-77. In a village close to Stone's compound, Sands meets up with his contacts Jessica and Rojar (Alki David).

As it turns out, Stone was born from a Muslim mother and a British father. Stone had spent his childhood in the Middle East, but was educated at Oxford. Stone's mother was killed in an attack by U.S. troops during Desert Storm, and as a result, a vengeful Stone formed the Black Sunday terrorist group. It is revealed that Eliana is Stone's second in command. She trains with a various guerrilla groups in the region, giving Stone the foundation he needs.

Now, Stone plans to use the X-77 and its pinpoint precision to drop two biological warfare bombs undetected one of them on Europe and one of them on the United States. Stone plans to pay Ratcher another $100 million to fly the X-77 and drop the two bombs. Sands, Jessica, and Rojar, make plans to get into Stone's compound and launch an attack, but Stone has about 60 heavily armed mercenaries guarding the compound. Rojar starts a gun fight between the terrorists while Sands rescues Jannick. After a feud about the money, Ratcher shoots and kills Stone.

Sands takes on a few of the terrorists by hand as Jessica shoots and kills Eliana. Jannick catches Ratcher while Sands and Jessica leave in the X-77 but Ratcher manages to shoot him and get up in the air in a F16. After a brief dogfight, Sands manages to shoot Ratcher down and returns home.

Cast

Production
It is set and was filmed in Bucharest, Romania across 60 days between March 1 and April 30, 2006.

When asked about the film later Seagal said "Sometimes you get in with people who say they have $30m to make a movie and they steal $25m and give you $5m to make the movie. And that's why you see movies that are just **** because the financiers have stolen everything."

Attribution controversy
Though the screenplay is credited exclusively to Seagal and frequent collaborator Joe Halpin (and the story is credited to Halpin), many elements of Flight of Fury make it appear to be an unofficial remake of the 1998 film Black Thunder. The scenario, characters, and even character names and specific scenes are often identical, but Black Thunder writer William C. Martell did not receive credit for his original screenplay, instead receiving only a "special thanks" at the end of the credits. Martell claims he was not even aware of Flight of Furys similarity to his own script until he saw it on IMDb, though he notes, "Someone involved has now contacted me, and I'm sure everything is going to turn out okay. Just some communications SNAFUs when rights were sold and resold." No further information on discussions between Martell and the makers of Flight of Fury appears to be publicly available; IMDb still lists Martell as "special thanks" in the listed credits of Flight of Fury.

Critical reception
Overall critical reaction was negative. Steven Seagal was praised because of his weight loss, but the film itself was highly criticized for its use of stock footage. The film has no rating on Rotten Tomatoes.

Seagalogy author Vern ranked Flight of Fury as one of Seagal's weakest efforts, noting, "In some ways the movie seems more competent than the last one, 'Attack Force'...but let's just say most people won’t find this one of the better Seagal pictures."

Howard Stern negatively reviewed and ridiculed the film on his radio show.

Despite negative reviews, the film was popular on DVD.

Home media
The DVD was released in Region 1 in the United States on February 20, 2007, and also on Region 2 in the United Kingdom on 16 April 2007. It was distributed by Sony Pictures Home Entertainment.

References

External links

Flight of Fury at Letterbox DVD

2007 films
2007 action thriller films
2007 direct-to-video films
American films about revenge
American action thriller films
American aviation films
Direct-to-video action films
Films about aviation accidents or incidents
Films about terrorism
Films about the United States Air Force
Films set on airplanes
Films shot in Bucharest
Films shot in Romania
Sony Pictures direct-to-video films
2000s English-language films
2000s American films